The filfola lizard or Maltese wall lizard (Podarcis filfolensis) is a species of lizard in the family Lacertidae.
It is found in Italy (in the Pelagian Islands) and in the island group of Malta.
Its natural habitats are Mediterranean-type shrubby vegetation, rocky areas, rocky shores, arable land, pastureland, and rural gardens.

P. filfolensis in Malta

In the Maltese Islands, there are four subspecies of the Maltese wall lizard, all of which are endemic there.

Podarcis filfolensis ssp. maltensis 

This subspecies is found on the three main islands: Malta, Gozo and Comino.  It is normally greenish and sometimes speckled.

Podarcis filfolensis ssp. filfolensis

This subspecies is endemic to the islet of Filfla just off the coast of Malta.  It is the largest of the four subspecies and is blackish with bluish spots.

Podarcis filfolensis ssp. kieselbachi

This subspecies is endemic to Selmunett, otherwise known as St.Paul's Islands.  Its colours vary greatly e.g. brown, grey, etc. with an orange belly and small black spots. The population became extinct in 2005.

Podarcis filfolensis ssp. generalensis

This subspecies is endemic to Fungus Rock (west coast of Gozo).  It has a reddish belly and blue-like flanks.

Other subspecies

A fifth subspecies is thought to exist on the island of Cominotto/Kemunett  and another subspecies, Podarcis filfolensis ssp. laurentimulleri,  occurs on the Italian islands of Linosa and Lampione.

Features and behaviour

Unlike the males, who have bright colours, young lizards and females have somewhat dull coloration (brownish).
The Maltese wall lizard usually eats small insects like ants or termites.

Males show territorial behaviour.  When other males enter its territory, it puffs up and raises its head.  A similar behaviour is seen when they attract females.  Mating takes place in spring.  One or two eggs are laid shortly after, and finally hatch between June and mid-August.

See also

 Endemic Maltese wildlife
 Endemism
 Filfla
 List of reptiles of Italy
 Madeiran wall lizard

References and sources

Savona-Ventura C. Taxonomical status of the Maltese wall lizard (Podarcis filfolensis BEDRIAGA 1876). Central Mediterranean Naturalist 2001, 3(3):89-95
Savona-Ventura C. The herpetofauna of Comino and satellite islets with a note on the colouration of Podarcis filfolensis. Animalia 1983; 10(1/3):87-93
Savona-Ventura C. The Natural History of St. Paul's Islands - Reptiles and Mammals. Potamon 1983; 11:32-34
Savona-Ventura C. Reptiles and amphibians in Maltese ecology. Potamon 1979; 1(2):14-16
Sciberras, A. (2005) Observation on the endangered population of the Maltese wall lizard of Selmunett island (Podarcis filfolensis kieselbachi).Unpublished work, presented to the chamber of young scientists of Malta at 4–10 April, winning the contest 1st place and  leading to the Belgian Science expo on 26 April to 1 May.
Sciberras, A.  (2007) Lizards At Id-Dwejra. Dwejra Heritage Park Gozo pgs.28-33. Dwejra Management Board.
Sciberras, A.  & Schembri,P.J.  (2008) Conservation Status  of St Paul's Island Wall Lizard (Podarcis filfolensis kieselbachi). Herpetological Bulletin-Number 105 pgs.28-34.

Podarcis
Fauna of Malta
Reptiles described in 1876
Endemic fauna of Malta
Taxa named by Jacques von Bedriaga
Taxonomy articles created by Polbot